AMD Generic Encapsulated Software Architecture (AGESA) is a procedure library developed by Advanced Micro Devices (AMD), used to perform the Platform Initialization (PI) on mainboards using their AMD64 architecture. As part of the BIOS of such mainboards, AGESA is responsible for the initialization of the CPU cores, chipset, main memory, and the HyperTransport controller.

History

AGESA was open sourced in early 2011, aiming to aid in the development of coreboot, a project attempting to replace PC's proprietary BIOS. However, such releases never became the basis for the development of coreboot beyond AMD's family 15h, as they were subsequently halted.

AGESA became particularly relevant with the AM4 platform, which AMD designed for futureproofing, and as of May 2019 has served as the base for three different generations of CPUs based on its Zen architecture. For each of these generations, a new branch of AGESA code has been released. AGESA versioning often runs separately for each of these three releases, so numbering regressions are bound to happen when going from one generation to the next.

The first version, named "Summit PI", launched in February 2017. It was targeted at the first generation Zen chips, and started with version 1.0.0.4. In December 2017, when Summit PI reached version 1.0.0.7, the branch was renamed to "Raven PI" (its version numbering was not reset), and it was released as the first version of AGESA to support Raven Ridge APUs.

The second version, supporting the Zen's second generation, known as Zen+, is named "Pinnacle PI", after the Ryzen processors' codename, Pinnacle Ridge. It launched in February 2018 with an initial version of 1.0.0.0a.

Then in March 2019, the third iteration of AGESA, named "ComboAM4 PI", was released, starting at version 0.0.7.0, introducing support for Zen 2-based processors.

"ComboAM4v2" supports Zen 3-based processors, while "ComboAM5PI" supports Zen 4-based processors in socket AM5 motherboards.

See also 
 Bootstrapping (computing)
 Coreboot
 Memory Reference Code

References

External links 
 Specification document by AMD (2008)
 ThomasNet General Software, Inc. First BIOS Provider to Support AMD Barcelona
 coreboot LinuxBIOS Enablement Strategy @AMD & AGESA Info (PDF)
 AGESA source code Link to AGESA source code in coreboot. The repository history contains AGESA source code for previously-supported platforms. 

AMD technologies

BIOS